Guignard Brick Works is a historic industrial site and national historic district located in Cayce, Lexington County, South Carolina. The brick works was established by the Guignard family in 1801 and over the years produced brick for many buildings in Columbia, South Carolina and throughout the South. The complex includes four brick beehive kilns, a historic brick office, and remnants of other industrial features of the brick works. Three of the four remaining kilns were built around 1920, the other was built in 1932. Clay for brickmaking was obtained from banks of the nearby Congaree River.

The site was added to the National Register of Historic Places in 1995.

See also
National Register of Historic Places listings in Lexington County, South Carolina

References

External links
NRHP Nomination Form

Industrial buildings and structures on the National Register of Historic Places in South Carolina
Industrial buildings completed in 1932
Buildings and structures in Lexington County, South Carolina
National Register of Historic Places in Lexington County, South Carolina
Historic districts on the National Register of Historic Places in South Carolina
Brickworks in the United States